Shani, or Shanaishchara, refers to the divine personification of the planet Saturn in Hinduism, and is one of the nine heavenly objects (Navagraha) in Hindu astrology. Shani is also a male Hindu deity in the Puranas, whose iconography consists of a black figure carrying a sword or danda (sceptre) and sitting on a crow. He is the god of Karma (deeds), justice, and retribution and delivers results depending upon one's thoughts, speech, and deeds (karma). Shani is the controller of longevity, misery, sorrow, old age, discipline, restriction, responsibility, delays, ambition, leadership, authority, humility, integrity, and wisdom born of experience. He also signifies spiritual asceticism, penance, discipline, and conscientious work. He married twice, first to Neela, the personification of the Blue Sapphire gemstone and second to Manda, a Gandharva princess.

Planet
Shani as a planet appears in various Hindu astronomical texts in Sanskrit, such as the 5th-century Aryabhatiya by Aryabhatta, the 6th-century Romaka by Latadeva and Pancha Siddhantika by Varahamihira, the 7th-century Khandakhadyaka by Brahmagupta and the 8th-century Sisyadhivrddida by Lalla. These texts present Shani as one of the planets and estimate the characteristics of the respective planetary motion. Other texts such as Surya Siddhanta dated to have been complete sometime between the 5th century and 10th century present their chapters on various planets as divine knowledge linked to deities.

The manuscripts of these texts exist in slightly different versions, present Shani's motion in the skies, but vary in their data, suggesting that the text were open and revised over their lives. The texts slightly disagree in their data, in their measurements of Shani's revolutions, apogee, epicycles, nodal longitudes, orbital inclination, and other parameters. For example, both Khandakhadyaka and Surya Siddhanta of Varaha state that Shani completes 146,564 revolutions on its own axis every 4,320,000 earth years, an Epicycle of Apsis as 60 degrees, and had an apogee (aphelia) of 240 degrees in 499 CE; while another manuscript of Soorya Siddhantha revises the revolutions to 146,568, the apogee to 236 degrees and 37 seconds and the Epicycle to about 49 degrees.

The 1st-millennium-CE Hindu scholars had estimated the time it took for sidereal revolutions of each planet including Shani, from their astronomical studies, with slightly different results:

Iconography 

Shani is depicted wearing blue or black robes, having dark complexion and riding a vulture or on an iron chariot drawn by eight horses. He holds in his hands a bow, an arrow, an axe and a trident. He is canonically represented riding on a large crow which follows him wherever he goes. Some astrologers believe he has more than one mount such as a horse, elephant, donkey, lion, dog, jackal, deer and vulture, although this is controversial.

Shani is believed to be the incarnation of Krishna according to Brahma Vaivarta Purana where Krishna said that he is "Shani among planets". He is also called Saneeswar meaning "Lord of Saturn" and is designated the task of granting the fruits of one's action, thus becoming the most feared amongst Hindu astrological gods. He is often the most misunderstood deity in the Hindu Pantheon as he is said to cause persistent chaos in one's life, and is known to be milder if worshipped.

Shani is the root for name for the day Saturday in many other Indian languages. In modern Hindi, Odia, Telugu, Bengali, Marathi, Urdu, Kannada and Gujarati, Saturday is called Shanivaar; Tamil: Sani kizhamai; Malayalam: Shaniyazhcha; Thai: Wạn s̄eār̒ (วันเสาร์).

Calendar 
Shani is the basis for Shanivara – one of the seven days that make a week in the Hindu calendar. This day corresponds to Saturday – after Saturn – in the Greco-Roman convention for naming the days of the week. Shani is considered to be the most malefic planet that brings restrictions and misfortunes.

Shani is part of the Navagraha in Hindu zodiac system, considered malefic, associated with spiritual asceticism, penance, discipline and conscientious work. The role and importance of the Navagraha developed over time with various influences. Deifying planetary bodies and their astrological significance occurred as early as the Vedic period and was recorded in the Vedas. The earliest work of astrology recorded in India is the Vedanga Jyotisha which began to be compiled in the 14th century BCE. It was possibly based on works from the Indus Valley Civilization as well as various foreign influences. Babylonian astrology which was the first astrology and calendar to develop, and was adopted by multiple civilizations including India. The classical planets, including Saturn.

The Navagraha developed from early works of astrology over time. Saturn and various classical planets were referenced in the Atharvaveda around 1000 BCE. The Navagraha was furthered by additional contributions from Western Asia, including Zoroastrian and Hellenistic influences. The Yavanajataka, or 'Science of the Yavanas', was written by the Indo-Greek named "Yavanesvara" ("Lord of the Greeks") under the rule of the Western Kshatrapa king Rudrakarman I. The Yavanajataka written in 120 CE is often attributed to standardizing Indian astrology. The Navagraha would further develop and culminate in the Shaka era with the Saka or Scythian, people. Additionally the contributions by the Saka people would be the basis of the Indian national calendar, which is also called the Saka calendar.

The Hindu calendar is a Lunisolar calendar which records both lunar and solar cycles. Like the Navagraha, it was developed with the successive contributions of various works.

Planet Shani rules over both zodiac signs, Capricorn and Aquarius, two of the twelve constellations in the zodiac system of Hindu astrology. If Shani rules over your zodiac sign, it is said you must wear a ring with a stone made of Blue Sapphire.

Deity
Shani is a deity in medieval era texts, who is considered inauspicious and is feared for delivering misfortune and loss to those who deserve it. He is also capable of conferring boons and blessings to the worthy, depending upon their karma. In medieval Hindu literature, he is mainly referred to as the son of Surya and Chhaya, or in few accounts as the son of Balarama and Revati. His alternate names include Ara, Kona and Kroda. As per the Hindu texts, 'peepal' or fig tree is the abode of Shani (while other texts associate the same tree with Vasudeva).  He is also believed to be the greatest teacher who rewards the righteous acts and punishes those who follow the path of evil, Adharma and betrayal.

In 2013, a 20-foot-tall statue of Lord Shani was established at Yerdanur in the mandal of Sangareddy, Medak district, Telangana,  nearly 40 kilometers from Hyderabad city. It was carved from a Monolith and weighs about nine tonnes.

Mantra Translation 
Shani's mantra is depicted here, in Sanskrit and English, with the translation;

English: "Om kaakadhwajaaya vidmahae khadga hastaaya dheemahi tanno mandah prachodayaat''

Sanskrit: ओम काकध्वजाय विद्महे खड्ग हस्ताय धीमहि तन्नो मंदः प्रचोदयात्

Translation: Om, Let me meditate on him who has crow in his flag, Oh, He who has a sword in his hand, give me higher intellect, And let Saneeswara illuminate my mind.

Dedicated Day 
On Saturdays, it is believed that one should worship Lord Shani to keep oneself away from evil and to reduce the hardships of life as he blesses those who willingly and voluntarily donate to the poor without seeking anything in return.

Shani puja is usually done to keep one safe from Lord Shani's malefic effects. On Saturday, the devotee also fasts from dawn to dusk. Wake up early in the morning and take oil bath after applying sesame oil on your body. After bath, wear black clothes for the day. On the whole day, use Sesame oil for lighting lamp.

Saturn Temples 

Shani temples are found in more populated areas of India, such as Maharashtra, Madhya Pradesh, Haryana, Tamil Nadu, Karnataka, West Bengal and Andhra Pradesh. 
Shani Shingnapur Dham in particular is a famous holy place associated with Lord Shani, the deity. Shani Shinganapur or Shingnapur is a village in the Indian state of Maharashtra. Situated in Nevasa taluka in Ahmednagar district, the village is known for its popular temple of Shani, the Hindu god associated with the planet Saturn. Shingnapur is 35 km from Ahmednagar city.
More common than Shani temples are artwork related to himself, which are found in all types of temples of various traditions within Hinduism, mostly connected to Shaivism. Popularity for praying to Shani, especially on Saturday's, has increased gradually over the years.

In television 
Daya Shankar Pandey played the role of Shani Dev in Mahima Shani Dev Ki which aired on NDTV Imagine from 2010 to 2012.
On 7 November 2016 the show Karmafal Daata Shani aired on Colors TV; it depicts the life of Shani. Kartikey Malviya plays the role of younger Shani and Rohit Khurana of mature Shani.The show ended on 9 March 2018.
 In 2017 the remake of the Karmafal Daata Shani was made in Kannada titled Shani telecasted on Colors Kannada. Sunil plays the role of young Shani. Pranav Sridhar plays the role of mature Shani. 
In 2020 the show Devi Adi Parashakti aired on Dangal TV; Rohit Khurana plays the role of Lord Shani.

See also 

 Rigvedic deities
 Nakshatra
 List of Natchathara temples
 Aditi
 Surya Namaskar
 List of Hindu deities
 List of Hindu temples
 List of Hindu pilgrimage sites

Notes

Further reading

External links 

 Astronomical Names for the Days of the Week, M Falk (1999)
 The God Shani or the Planet Saturn, Iconongraphy on a column in Madurai Meenakshi Temple, British Library
 Shani Chalisa In Hindi With English PDF File

Navagraha
Hindu gods
Rigvedic deities
Saturnian deities
Justice gods
Shani